Diamond Reef System, including each individual Hover Station and the new Multi-Portal System, are trademarked, skill evaluation and safety-based diving curriculums that utilize the world's first portable, collapsible underwater obstacle course to simulate fragile reef or dive wreck structure for diver buoyancy skill and underwater photography training. A form of scuba Gymkhana, the program was designed by Pete Wallingford in 1988 to educate scuba instructors and scuba divers on how to safely teach and promote situational awareness, proper body positioning and safe interaction with coral reefs, fragile marine ecosystems and shipwrecks. The program was adopted by the Environmental Protection Agency, the National Oceanic and Atmospheric Administration, dive store operators and dive resort/charter operators worldwide.

History

In 1989, Pete Wallingford, an Educational Technologist from Seattle, Washington with a background in multi-store dive operations management, scuba diving instruction and commercial diving, initially started a marine conservation organization called "The Friends of the Reef Foundation" in response to customers of his dive stores complaining about the declining state of the coral reefs. For the international diving community he created a market based environmental education program that included a portable underwater obstacle course and adjunct curriculum for trim, proper weighting and buoyancy-control training, which was made of PVC pipe hoops shaped like diamonds, subsequently named Hover Stations. The program was adopted by the National Oceanic Atmospheric Administration in 1989. By 1991, the Diamond Reef System had developed into an instructional, marketing and dive industry promotional program under the company, Buoyancy Training Systems, Inc. The name Buoyancy Training Systems, Inc eventually was renamed Buoyancy Training Systems International, Inc. and presently Diamond Reef Training Systems, International. The Diamond Reef System was adopted into the Environmental Protection Agency's diving education program in 1991. It also received recognition from the ROLEX Corporation, Diving Equipment Manufacturers Association, University of Washington educational technology department and dive training program, Glen Egstrom Ph.D at the University of California at Los Angeles diving program, University of North Carolina diving program, Alex Brylske Ph.D a Professional Association of Dive Instructors' Course Director and Hillary Viders Ph.D at the National Association of Underwater Instructors. Permission was subsequently given by all diver certification agencies worldwide (to include PADI, NAUI, BSAC, CMAS, YMCA, SSI and GUE) to permit participating licensed and insured instructors and their respective Divemasters / Divecons to include the Diamond Reef Hover Stations and Challenge Courses in pool and open water training. This was due to the effectiveness of the training aids, annual Diamond Reef marine conservation stamp, diver logbook validation system  and the actionable 'diver release' safety feature that was built into each Hover Station.

Equipment
The US patents for the underwater buoyancy training obstacle course target hoop and the underwater buoyancy training obstacle course target set were issued to Peter A. Wallingford on August 25, 1992, patent numbers: 5141441, and 5141440 respectively. The usual validity of a US patent is 20 years from date of filing.

Description

The underwater obstacle course kit for buoyancy training includes a detailed retailer/resort/charter boat operator and dive instructor manual, a set of seven collapsible, buoyant Hover Stations, each with a cord for tethering to a weight on the bottom, and a line holder to store the cord and adjust its operating length. Several alternative hoop geometries are covered in the patents (circular, triangular, octagonal and rectangular are mentioned), but the one recommended and generally used is a square in a diamond-shaped orientation, threaded with marine shock cord, tethered by a corner, allowing the open corner to float upwards as well as providing a 'safety release' or flexible opening to reduce the chance of diver entanglement. This is considered by the designer to be the most responsible and efficient shape considering the diver and equipment passing through or hovering within the Hover Station. It also minimizes the amount of material and work required for an effective target, and the diamond configuration has better underwater stability than the other configurations. Standard sized Diamond Reef Hover Stations include 5 each measuring  sides and 2 each, size large measuring  pipe lengths. These 'hoops' can be made from any suitable material, but  diameter, schedule 40 (US) PVC pipe, elbows and end caps have been found the most effective.

The Diamond shaped Hover Station is assembled from straight tubular sections with open ends connected by right angle elbows and the unconnected ends sealed by plugs or caps. The new Diamond Reef Portal invention, also collapsible and portable, permits multiple Hover Stations to be connected together to improve stabilization and simulate more challenging coral reef, cavern, cave and shipwreck entrances. The lower two legs of each Hover Station feature two sets of 4, 1/4" diameter through-holes to permit ease of descending with the buoyant Hover Stations. The assembly can be glued together (if student divers are closely supervised as the release feature is not as forgiving) or held together by internal shock cord for safety and convenience reasons; allowing dislocation of the joints for compact storage. The unconnected corner is generally deployed as the high point of the Hover Station and it allows a diver to escape upwards if unable to pass through the 'hoop'.

In the open water environment for ease of the complete or partial course set-up, an octagonal shaped 54 foot diameter 'Base Station' consisting of 8 separate environmentally safe 'concrete' anchors, connected with stainless cable can be situated at the appropriate depth depending on visibility, tidal flow and boat traffic. One anchor can be used for determining the proper weight requirements for each diver by practicing the simulated empty tank (SET) weighting procedure. Proper weighting and focused breathing are the foundations of demonstrating proper control at depth.

Setup
As little as one, two or as many Hover Stations that are available may be set up to include Slalom, escalator and rollercoaster obstacle course layouts using the kit components. These courses are intended to be set up for buoyancy training, mid-watermanship skill development and evaluation in relatively 'quiet' (slack tide), safe water with little or no current and more than fifteen feet of visibility. A standard set comprises seven Hover Stations (5 standard size, 2 large, to be anchored at the beginning and end of the official Diamond Reef Challenge Course. Note, and not shown in the below diagrams, that the two large 48" Hover Stations are positioned at the 15' depth to promote buddy teamwork at the beginning of the dive prior to descending to the bottom and the 3 minute 15' safety stop at the end of the no-decompression dive.
The slalom course can include direction changes between sequential hoops which are set up in a row with the cords adjusted to keep the hoops at the same depth, preferably about 15–20 feet apart and three feet from the bottom.
The escalator course includes an increase or decrease in depth between sequential hoops. This layout is for practicing gradual ascents and descents.
The rollercoaster course includes both increases and decreases of depth between sequential hoops. Preferably the hoops are set up by arranging with the depths used in the escalator course aligning them in a row such that the successive hoops are deeper and shallower from one to the next (for example: 3 → 2 → 4 → 1 → 5). This layout is for practicing controlled alternating ascents and descents.

Procedures
The system can be used for training and assessing trim and diver buoyancy control, non-destructive maneuvering (fin-tip awareness), dive buddy teamwork, dive manufactured equipment testing and slow motion hovering skills (namely Horizontal Hover-Stall maneuvers). The 15 minute Diamond Reef Challenge Course is staged utilizing all seven Hover Stations.

References

External links
Courses: Concrete socks OK

Underwater diver training